Michael L. Dunbar (December 31, 1948 – September 13, 2013) was an American football and baseball coach.  He served as the head football coach at Central Washington University in 1983 and from 1987 to 1991 and at the University of Northern Iowa from 1997 to 2000, compiling a career college football coaching record of 83–24–1.  Dunbar was also the head baseball coach at Central Washington for one season, in 1983, tallying mark of 25–20–1.  He graduated from the University of Washington in 1972 with a B.A. in education and from Pacific Lutheran University in 1979 with an M.A. in education. Dunbar died of cancer on September 13, 2013, in his hometown of Dupont, Washington, at the age of 64.

Head coaching record

Football

References

1948 births
2013 deaths
Central Washington Wildcats baseball coaches
Central Washington Wildcats football coaches
California Golden Bears football coaches
Minnesota Golden Gophers football coaches
New Mexico State Aggies football coaches
Northern Iowa Panthers football coaches
Northwestern Wildcats football coaches
Pacific Lutheran Lutes football coaches
Toledo Rockets football coaches
UMass Minutemen football coaches
Pacific Lutheran University alumni
University of Washington College of Education alumni
People from Lakewood, Washington
Sportspeople from Tacoma, Washington
Coaches of American football from Washington (state)
Baseball coaches from Washington (state)
Deaths from cancer in Washington (state)